Rebecca "Becky" Dixon (born April 14, 1951) is an American television broadcaster. She is best known as the first woman co-host of ABC’s Wide World of Sports, alongside Frank Gifford, from 1987 to 1988. Dixon is currently the president and owner of AyerPlay Productions in Tulsa, Oklahoma. She has also served as a news and sports anchor for KTUL-TV and host of the Oklahomans program which profiled celebrated Oklahomans.

Early life
Dixon was born on April 14, 1951, in Coffeyville, Kansas. She grew up on her family’s ranch in Nowata County, Oklahoma.

Dixon attended The University of Tulsa in Tulsa, Oklahoma. She graduated in 1973 with a bachelor's degree in elementary education and a concentration in journalism. Dixon was a member of the Chi Omega sorority.

Career
Dixon began her career in broadcasting in 1980 as a news and sports anchor for KTUL-TV, the local ABC affiliate in Tulsa. With several years of sports reporting under her belt, Dixon was approached by Dennis Swanson, the president of ABC Sports, upon seeing a tape of her work at KTUL.

In 1986, Dixon became the first woman to anchor a network sports show when she became the co-host of ABC’s Wide World of Sports. Dixon co-hosted the show alongside Frank Gifford. In addition to her role as co-host, Dixon served as a reporter, covering major sporting events such as the Super Bowl, Winter Olympics, Triple Crown, and World Gymnastics Championships.

During an interview with Tulsa People magazine Dixon said, “I really enjoyed the sidelines, because it included a bit of everything – feature reports, injuries, interviews… You were the eyes and ears on the field.”

She left network broadcasting in 1989 and briefly co-hosted The Dallas Cowboys’ Jerry Jones show before returning to Tulsa.

Back in Tulsa, Dixon created Dixon Productions, a broadcasting company. Soon after, Dixon launched Oklahomans, a statewide broadcast that highlighted the achievements of many Oklahomans. During the show’s 23-year run, Dixon interviewed numerous Oklahoma natives including Garth Brooks, Carrie Underwood, David L. Boren, T. Boone Pickens, Mickey Mantle and Ron Howard. Oklahomans ended its run in late 2014.

In 1994, Dixon partnered with Ed Taylor, a pioneer in the cable and satellite communications profession at his television company, Taylor Communications. Dixon became president of Taylor Communications in 1997. In 2013, she purchased Taylor Communications and renamed it AyerPlay Productions.

Dixon is one of seven honorees who were formally inducted into the Oklahoma Hall of Fame on November 17, 2016.

Personal life
Dixon currently resides in Tulsa, Oklahoma, with her husband, Patrick Keegan. Dixon has two children, Dan and Jennifer. On May 4, 2016, Dixon received the Sadie Adwon Lifetime Achievement Award by the Association of Women in Communications.

References

1951 births
American sports announcers
Women sports announcers
Living people
Wide World of Sports (American TV series)
University of Tulsa alumni
Television personalities from Tulsa, Oklahoma
Dallas Cowboys announcers
People from Nowata, Oklahoma
American horse racing announcers
American television reporters and correspondents
Gymnastics broadcasters
American women television journalists